Ance Féas is a commune in the department of Pyrénées-Atlantiques, southwestern France. The municipality was established on 1 January 2017 by merger of the former communes of Féas (the seat) and Ance.

See also 
Communes of the Pyrénées-Atlantiques department

References 

Communes of Pyrénées-Atlantiques